The 2017–18 Czech Cup, known as the MOL Cup for sponsorship reasons, wass the 25th season of the annual knockout football tournament of the Czech Republic. It began with the preliminary round in July 2017 and is due to end with the final in May 2018. The winner of the cup will gain the right to play in the group stage of the 2018–19 UEFA Europa League.

Teams

Preliminary round
The preliminary round ties were played from 13 – 16 July 2017. 78 teams competed in this round, all from level 4 or below of the Czech league system, as well as two teams from the third tier of Czech football. All time listed are CEST.

First round
The first round started on 18 July, with matches played between then and 23 July. 86 teams took part in this stage of the competition.

Second round
54 teams participated in the second round; 11 First League teams (all other than those playing in European competitions) entered the competition at this stage, joining the 43 winners of the first round matches. The draw was made on 26 July.

Third round
32 teams participate in the third round; the final five First League teams entered the competition at this stage (holders FC Fastav Zlín, Slavia Prague, Viktoria Plzeň, Sparta Prague and Mladá Boleslav). They are joined by the 27 winners of the second round matches. The draw was made on 30 August.

Fourth round
The fourth round commenced on 24 October 2017.

Quarter-finals

Semi-finals

Final

See also
 2017–18 Czech First League
 2017–18 Czech National Football League

References

External links
Season on soccerway.com

Czech Cup seasons
Cup
Czech